Sadulshahar (Assembly constituency) is one of constituencies of Rajasthan Legislative Assembly in the Ganganagar (Lok Sabha constituency).

Sadulshahar Constituency covers all voters from Sadulshahar tehsil and part of Shriganganagar tehsil, which includes ILRC Mirzewala, ILRC Hindumalkot, ILRC Shivpur, ILRC Ram Nagar (excluding Ganganangar Municipal Council), Chunawadh and Chak Maharaj Ka of ILRC Ganganagar.

Election Results

2018

References

See also 
 Member of the Legislative Assembly (India)

Sri Ganganagar district
Assembly constituencies of Rajasthan